Onuava is a Celtic fertility goddess. She is associated with the earth and is known only from inscriptions in Gaul.

References 

Michael Jordan, Encyclopedia of Gods, Kyle Cathie Limited, 2002

Gaulish goddesses
Fertility goddesses
Earth goddesses